Skuldelev is a town in the Frederikssund Municipality in North Zealand, Denmark. It is located 5km northeast of Skibby, 11km south of Jægerspris and 11km southwest of Frederikssund. As of 2022, it has a population of 869.

References 

Cities and towns in the Capital Region of Denmark
Frederikssund Municipality